Temple Israel is the second oldest Jewish congregation in Georgia, United States. Founded in 1854 as Temple B'nai Israel, a Charter Member of the Union of American Hebrew Congregations, now the Union for Reform Judaism, it remains a congregation affiliated with Reform Judaism. Today the Jewish population of Columbus is less than 750 individuals and Temple Israel community retains around 150 members. In June 2021 Rabbi Shmuel Polin became the Rabbi of Temple Israel.

References

See also
Goldring / Woldenberg Institute of Southern Jewish Life
Reform Judaism

Jewish Community Centers in the United States